The Sonnenspitze, also called Sonnenberg (English: Sun Peak or Sun Mountain), is a 1,622-meter high peak in the Ammergau Alps of Bavaria, Germany.

Mountains of Bavaria
Ammergau Alps